Victor Hogan (born 25 July 1989) is a South African track and field athlete who competes in the discus throw. He has a personal best of 67.62m thrown in Stellenbosch at the South African championships making him 10 time South African Champion, and 3 time African Champion.

Born in Vredenburg, he took part in discus competitions from a young age: he participated at the 2006 Gymnasiade, won at the 2007 African Junior Athletics Championships, and came fourth at the 2008 World Junior Championships in Athletics. His best throw of 65.52 m with the lighter junior discus in 2008 ranked him as the fifth best junior ever at the time.

Hogan established himself on the national senior circuit in 2010 with three wins on the Yellow Pages Series and his first national title. He claimed his first major medal at the 2010 African Championships in Athletics soon after, taking the bronze medal. He represented Africa at the 2010 IAAF Continental Cup, coming eighth. He won a second South African title in 2011, but this was marred by an incident where an official was struck by Hogan's discus on the field.

Hogan cleared sixty metres with the discus for the first time in 2011 and was the runner-up at the 2011 All-Africa Games with a throw of 62.60 metres. He threw a best of 62.76 m in Bilbao in June 2012 and went on to take the gold medal at the 2012 African Championships the following month. However, he did not make the South African Olympic squad because he had not achieved the qualifying standard of 63 metres.

In 2016, Hogan threw a new personal best of 67.62m, the furthest distance ever thrown at a South African Championship, qualifying for the 2016 Rio Olympic Games. Hogan retrieved a bronze medal at the Doha Diamond Leuague in Qatar with a distance of 65.59m, and a silver medal at the Rome Diamond league with a distance of 64.04m. Hogan also won the 20th African Senior Championships with a distance of 61.68m, making him 3 time African Champion.

Competition record

References

External links

1989 births
Living people
People from Saldanha Bay Local Municipality
White South African people
South African male discus throwers
Commonwealth Games competitors for South Africa
Athletes (track and field) at the 2014 Commonwealth Games
World Athletics Championships athletes for South Africa
Athletes (track and field) at the 2016 Summer Olympics
Olympic athletes of South Africa
African Games silver medalists for South Africa
African Games medalists in athletics (track and field)
Athletes (track and field) at the 2011 All-Africa Games
African Championships in Athletics winners
South African Athletics Championships winners
20th-century South African people
21st-century South African people